George Samuel Eccles (1874 – 18 December 1945) was an English footballer who played at right-back in the Football League and Southern League for Burslem Port Vale, Wolverhampton Wanderers, Everton, Preston North End, West Ham United and Bolton Wanderers. He helped Bolton Wanderers to win promotion out of the Second Division in 1904–05.

Career
Eccles played for Middleport, before joining Burslem Port Vale in June 1893. He played six Second Division games in the 1893–94 season. He featured once in the FA Cup and made 27 league appearances in the 1894–95 season, claiming one goal in a 4–4 draw with Newcastle United at the Athletic Ground on 6 October. On 26 February, when heading for a match against Notts County at Trent Bridge, he misread the train timetables and selected a non-existent train that only ran on market days, thereby missing the game. He played 17 league and two FA Cup games in the 1895–96 season, and broke his collarbone in February 1896. He was sold to Wolverhampton Wanderers for a 'considerable' fee in May 1896. "Wolves" finished tenth and third in the First Division in 1896–97 and 1897–98. Eccles scored one goal in 36 league games during his two years at Molineux, and then moved on to league rivals Everton. The "Toffees" finished fourth, eleventh, and seventh in 1898–99, 1899–1900, and 1900–01. He played 56 league games during his three seasons at Goodison Park, before switching to Preston North End. He did not feature in the Second Division for the "Lambs" in 1901–02, and instead transferred to West Ham United. The "Hammers" finished tenth and twelfth in the Southern League in 1902–03 and 1903–04, with Eccles playing 59 league games at the Memorial Grounds. He then made a brief return to the Football League, playing six league games to help Bolton Wanderers win promotion out of the Second Division in 1904–05.

Career statistics
Source:

Honours
Bolton Wanderers
Football League Second Division second-place promotion: 1904–05

References

1874 births
1945 deaths
Sportspeople from Newcastle-under-Lyme
English footballers
Association football defenders
Port Vale F.C. players
Wolverhampton Wanderers F.C. players
Everton F.C. players
Preston North End F.C. players
West Ham United F.C. players
Bolton Wanderers F.C. players
English Football League players
Southern Football League players
Bolton Wanderers F.C. non-playing staff
English Football League representative players